Luigina Perversi (February 3, 1914 – October 26, 1983) was an Italian gymnast who competed in the 1928 Summer Olympics. In 1928 she won the silver medal as member of the Italian gymnastics team.

References

1914 births
1983 deaths
Italian female artistic gymnasts
Olympic gymnasts of Italy
Gymnasts at the 1928 Summer Olympics
Olympic silver medalists for Italy
Olympic medalists in gymnastics
Medalists at the 1928 Summer Olympics